Astroceramus is a genus of abyssal sea stars in the family Goniasteridae.

Etymology 
"Astrocramus"  is made up of  two Latin root words, "Astrum" which means star, and "ceramo" meaning tile. This clearly tells the shape of the organism; star shaped tile of all its species.

Species list
According to World Register of Marine Species: 
 Astroceramus boninensis Kogure & Tachikawa, 2009 – Japan
 Astroceramus brachyactis H.L. Clark, 1941 – Caribbean
 Astroceramus cadessus Macan, 1938
 Astroceramus callimorphus Fisher, 1906 – Hawaii
 Astroceramus denticulatus McKnight, 2006 – New Zealand
 Astroceramus eldredgei Mah, 2015 – Hawaii
 Astroceramus fisheri Koehler, 1909
 Astroceramus lionotus Fisher, 1913 – Philippines
 Astroceramus sphaeriostictus Fisher, 1913 – Philippines

References

External links

 Mah, C. (2014), Astroceramus Fisher, 1906 In: Mah, C.L. (2015) World Asteroidea database. Accessed through: World Register of Marine Species.
 

Goniasteridae